Events in the year 1942 in Brazil.

Establishments 
 Construction of the Basilica Shrine of Our Lady Mediatrix of All Graces was completed.

Incumbents

Federal government
 President: Getúlio Vargas

Governors 
 Alagoas: Ismar de Góis Monteiro
 Amazonas: Álvaro Botelho Maia
 Bahia: Landulfo Alves (till 3 December); Renato Pinto Aleixo (from 3 December)
 Ceará: Francisco de Meneses Pimentel
 Espírito Santo: João Punaro Bley
 Goiás: Pedro Ludovico Teixeira
 Maranhão:
 Mato Grosso: Júlio Strübing Müller
 Minas Gerais: Benedito Valadares Ribeiro
 Pará: José Carneiro da Gama Malcher
 Paraíba: Rui Carneiro
 Paraná: Manuel Ribas
 Pernambuco: Agamenon Magalhães
 Piauí: Leônidas Melo 
 Rio Grande do Norte: Rafael Fernandes Gurjão 
 Rio Grande do Sul: Osvaldo Cordeiro de Farias
 Santa Catarina: Nereu Ramos
 São Paulo: Ademar de Barros (till 4 June); Fernando de Sousa Costa (from 4 June)
 Sergipe: Milton Pereira de Azevedo (till 27 March); Augusto Maynard Gomes (from 27 March)

Vice governors 
 Rio Grande do Norte: no vice governor
 São Paulo: no vice governor

Events
28 January- Brazil breaks diplomatic relations with the Axis countries.
July 26- The Brazilian ship Tamandaré is sunk by the German submarine U-66 (1940) off the coast of Trinidad and Tobago.
August 17 - The ships Itagiba and Arará are torpedoed  by German submarine U-507.
August 22 - President Getúlio Vargas signs the declaration of war against Germany and Italy.
1 November - The Cruzeiro "antigo" is adopted as the official currency.
date unknown - Aircraft manufacturer Companhia Aeronáutica Paulista is established in São Paulo.

Arts and culture

Books
Jorge Amado - Gabriela
Júlio Afrânio Peixoto - Pepitas

Films
Saludos Amigos (first appearance of José Carioca, the cigar-smoking Brazilian parrot)

Music
Heitor Villa-Lobos	- Rudepoêma (orchestral version)

Births
19 January - Nara Leão, singer and actress (died 1989)
6 March - Flora Purim, jazz singer
19 March - José Serra, politician
20 April - Roberto Freire, politician
23 April - Jorge Antunes, composer
3 June - Celso Amorim,  diplomat and politician
26 June - Gilberto Gil, singer, guitarist, and songwriter
7 August - Caetano Veloso, musician and writer 
23 August
 Jarbas Vasconcelos, politician and lawyer
 Susana Vieira, actress (as Sônia Maria Vieira Gonçalves)
26 October - Anecy Rocha, actress (died 1977)

Deaths
23 April - Olga Benário Prestes, political activist (born 1908 in Germany)
17 October - Sebastião da Silveira Cintra, Roman Catholic cardinal (born 1882)

References

See also 
1942 in Brazilian football
List of Brazilian films of 1942

 
1940s in Brazil
Years of the 20th century in Brazil
Brazil
Brazil